Quality Control is the second studio album by American hip hop group Jurassic 5. It was released on June 6, 2000 by Interscope Records.

Critical reception

At Metacritic, which assigns a normalized rating out of 100 to reviews from professional publications, Quality Control received an average score of 77 based on 17 reviews, indicating "generally favorable reviews".

In 2015, it was included in Pastes list of "10 Hip-Hop Albums for People Who Don't Like Hip-Hop".

Track listing

Charts

Certifications

References

External links
 

2000 albums
Jurassic 5 albums
Interscope Records albums